Denis Carey is an Irish musician and composer known for his solo work and as a member of Brock McGuire Band.

Career
Along with Dave Keary and Ray Fean, Carey composed and produced the soundtrack for the Canadian film The Divine Ryans, featuring Oscar nominee Pete Postlethwaite.
In 2000, Carey was specially commissioned by Shannon Heritage to compose and arrange the music for the show Style at Bunratty Folk Park in County Clare. The music for this show was recorded by Carey for the 2001 release Style - Stories of Irish Dance.

Carey won the 2004 award for LiveIreland.com's composer of the year.

In 2009, Carey released his album Moving On, which features Máirtín O'Connor, Paul Brock, Manus McGuire, Denis Ryan, Zoe Conway, Kenneth Rice, Tommy Hayes and others.

In January 2010, Carey won LiveIreland.com's Composer of the Year Award for the second time.

The Brock McGuire Band released "Green Grass Blue Grass" featuring Ricky Skaggs. The album was launched at The Grand Ole Opry on 11 March 2011 to a sold-out crowd.

In 2012, Denis released his first collection of original songs titled, "Denis Carey, Own Compositions".

Notable performances
Grand Ole Opry, Nashville, Tennessee
The Town Hall, Broadway, New York,
The Rebecca Cohn Auditorium, Halifax, Canada 
National Stadium, Dublin, Ireland
Páirc Uí Chaoimh, Cork City, Ireland
Celtic Colours, Cape Breton, Canada
Milwaukee Irish Fest, Wisconsin, USA

Previous collaborations
Symphony Nova Scotia
Royal Scottish National Orchestra
Shane MacGowan
Jon Kenny
The Dubliners
Ryan's Fancy
Pat Shortt

Discography
Images
An Turas (2000)
Moving On (2009)
Green Grass Blue Grass with The Brock McGuire Band (2011)

Personal life
Originally from Newport, County Tipperary, Carey is the first cousin of Denis Ryan of Ryan's Fancy, and the father of entrepreneur Mark Carey.

References

External links

Five Line Music record label
The Brock McGuire Band official website

Irish folk musicians
Living people
Musicians from County Tipperary
Year of birth missing (living people)
Place of birth missing (living people)